A Jain temple, Derasar (Gujarati: દેરાસર) or Basadi (Kannada: ಬಸದಿ) is the place of worship for Jains, the followers of Jainism. Jain architecture is essentially restricted to temples and monasteries, and Jain buildings generally reflect the prevailing style of the place and time they were built.

Jain temple architecture is generally close to Hindu temple architecture, and in ancient times Buddhist architecture. Normally the same builders and carvers worked for all religions, and regional and period styles are generally similar. For over 1,000 years, the basic layout of a Hindu or most Jain temples has consisted of a small garbhagriha or sanctuary for the main murti or cult images, over which the high superstructure rises, then one or more larger mandapa halls.

Māru-Gurjara architecture or the "Solanki style" is, a particular temple style from Gujarat and Rajasthan (both regions with a strong Jain presence) that originated in both Hindu and Jain temples around the year 1000, but became enduringly popular with Jain patrons. It has remained in use, in somewhat modified form, to the present day, indeed also becoming popular again for some Hindu temples in the last century. The style is seen in the groups of pilgrimage temples at Dilwara on Mount Abu, Taranga, Girnar, and Palitana.

Terms
Derasar is a word used for a Jain temple in Gujarat and southern Rajasthan. Basadi is a Jain shrine or temple in Karnataka. The word is generally used in South India. Its historical use in North India is preserved in the names of the Vimala Vasahi and Luna Vasahi temples of Mount Abu. The Sanskrit word is vasati, it implies an institution including residences of scholars attached to the shrine.

Temples may be divided into Shikar-bandhi Jain temples, public dedicated temple buildings, normally with a high superstructure, typically a north Indian shikhara tower above the shrine) and the Ghar Jain temple, a private Jain house shrine. A Jain temple which is known as a pilgrimage centre is often termed a Tirtha.

The main image of a Jain temple is known as a mula nayak.  A Manastambha (column of honor) is a pillar that is often constructed in front of Jain temples. It has four 'Moortis' i.e. stone figures of the main god of that temple. One facing each direction: North, East, South and West.

Architecture

Jain temples are built with various architectural designs.  The earliest survivals of Jain architecture are part of the Indian rock-cut architecture tradition, initially shared with Buddhism, and by the end of the classical period with Hinduism. Very often numbers of rock-cut Jain temples and monasteries share a site with those of the other religions, as at Udayagiri, Bava Pyara, Ellora, Aihole, Badami, Kalugumalai and Pataini temple. The Ellora Caves are a late site, which contains temples of all three religions, as the earlier Buddhist ones give way to later Hindu excavations.

There is considerable similarity between the styles of the different religions, but often the Jains placed large figures of one or more of the 24 tirthankaras in the open air rather than inside the shrine. These statues later began to be very large, normally standing nude figures in the kayotsarga meditation position (which is similar to standing at attention).

In recent times, the use of murti images has become controversial within Jainism, and some smaller sects reject them entirely, while others are selective in terms of which figures they allow images of. In sects which largely disapprove of images, the religious buildings are far more simple.

Following the regional styles in Hindu temples, Jain temples in North India generally use the north Indian nagara style, while those in South India use the dravida style, although the north Indian Māru-Gurjara style or Solanki style has made some inroads in the south over the last century or so. For example, the Mel Sithamur Jain Math in Tamil Nadu has a large gopuram tower, similar to those of local Hindu temples.

Characteristics of the original Māru-Gurjara style are "the external walls of the temples have been structured by increasing numbers of projections and recesses, accommodating sharply carved statues in niches. These are normally positioned in superimposed registers, above the lower bands of mouldings. The latter display continuous lines of horse riders, elephants, and kīrttimukhas. Hardly any segment of the surface is left unadorned."  The main shikhara tower usually has many urushringa subsidiary spirelets on it, and two smaller side-entrances with porches are common in larger temples.

Later, with Dilwara in the lead, surrounding the main temple with a curtain of devakulikā shrines, each with a small spire became a distinctive feature of the Jain temples of West India, still employed in some modern temples. These are fairly plain on the outer walls, and often raised on a very high platform, so that the outside of larger temples can resemble a fortress with high walls.  However the entrance(s), often up high, wide steps, are not designed for actual defence, even though medieval Muslim armies and others destroyed many Jain temples in the past, often permanently.

Inside the temple, the Māru-Gurjara style features extremely lavish carving, especially on columns, large and intricately carved rosettes on the ceilings of mandapas, and a characteristic form of "flying arch" between columns, which has no structural role, and is purely decorative. Most early temples in the style are in various local shades of pink, buff or brown sandstone, but the Dilwara temples are in a very pure white marble which lightens the style and has become considered very desirable.

While, before British India, large Buddhist or Hindu temples (and indeed Muslim mosques) have very often been built with funds from a ruler, this was infrequently the case with Jain temples. Instead they were typically funded by wealthy Jain individuals or families. For this reason, and often the smaller numbers of Jains in the population, Jain temples tend to be at the small or middle end of the range of sizes, but at pilgrimage sites they may cluster in large groups - there are altogether several hundred at Palitana, tightly packed within several high-walled compounds called "tuks" or "tonks".  Temple charitable trusts, such as the very large Anandji Kalyanji Trust, founded in the 17th century and now maintaining 1,200 temples, play a very important role in funding temple building and maintenance.

Etiquette
There are some guidelines to follow when one is visiting a Jain temple:
 Before entering the temple, one should bathe and wear fresh washed clothes or some special puja (worship) clothes – while wearing these one must neither have eaten anything nor visited the washroom. However, drinking of water is permitted.
 One should not take any footwear (including socks) inside the temple. Leather items like a belt, purse etc. are not allowed inside the temple premises.
 One should not be chewing any edibles (food, gum, mints, etc.), and no edibles should be stuck in the mouth.
 One should try to keep as silent as possible inside the temple.
 Mobile phones should not be used in the temple. One should keep them switched off.

Prevailing traditional customs should be followed regarding worshipping at the temple and touching an idol. They can vary depending on the region and the specific sect.

Gallery

India

Outside India

See also

 List of largest Jain temples
 List of Jain temples
 Jain art
 Jain Center of America
 Jain flag
 Jain house temple
 Jain sculpture
 Jain stupa
 Manastambha
 Tirtha (Jainism)

References

Citations

Sources
 Harle, J.C., The Art and Architecture of the Indian Subcontinent, 2nd edn. 1994, Yale University Press Pelican History of Art, 
 

 
Jain architecture